David Michael Lowe (born 11 November 1964) is an Australian biographer and historian of modern international affairs, and of Australia's role therein, especially with reference to Asia and the Pacific.

Early life and education 
David Lowe was born on 11 November 1964. He completed undergraduate studies at Monash University in Australia, graduating with First Class Honours in 1987. Lowe was awarded his doctorate in 1991 from the University of Cambridge.

Academic career 
Lowe is the co-founder of the Australian Policy and History network, the Chair and founder of the Contemporary Histories Research Group and was an elected board member of the Australian Historical Studies journal in 2003. Lowe has previously been a member of the Australian Department of Foreign Affairs and Trade Editorial Advisory Board. From 2009-2014, Lowe was the Director of the Alfred Deakin Institute.

In 2015 he was elected a Fellow of the Academy of Social Sciences in Australia.

Lowe has been awarded several Australian Research Council grants and other public sector funding grants for research projects.

He has published scholarly articles in journals including the Journal of Contemporary History, The International Journal of Cultural Policy, The Australian Journal of Politics and History, and The Journal of Imperial and Commonwealth History. Lowe has also written articles for The Conversation.

In 2016, Lowe was interviewed for the television series Howard on Menzies.

Lowe is currently the Chair in Contemporary History at Deakin University in Victoria.

Selected works

Books 
 Carola Lentz and David Lowe, Remembering Independence, Routledge, Abingdon, United Kingdom, forthcoming 2017. 
 David Lowe and Tony Joel, Remembering the Cold War: Global Contest and National Stories, Routledge, Abingdon United Kingdom, 2013. 
 David Lowe, Percy Spender: Australian Between Empires, Pickering and Chatto, London, 2010. 
 Joan Beaumont, Christopher Waters, David Lowe, with Garry Woodard, Ministers, Mandarins and Diplomats; Australian Foreign Policy Making, 1941–1969, Melbourne University Press, 2003. 
 David Lowe, Menzies and 'the Great World Struggle': Australia's Cold War, 1948–54, UNSW Press, Sydney, 1999. 
 Roy Hay, David Lowe and Don Gibb, with Bill Anderson, Breaking the Mould: Deakin University, the First Twenty-Five Years, Deakin University, Geelong, 2002.

Book series editorship 
 Remembering the Modern World (with Tony Joel), Routledge, UK.

As editor 
 Cassandra Atherton, David Lowe and Alyson Miller (eds), The Unfinished Atomic Bomb, Rowman and Littlefield, Lanham, MD, forthcoming 2017.
 David Lowe, David Lee, Carl Bridge (eds), Australia goes to Washington: A History of Australian Diplomatic Representation in the United States, Australian National University Press, Canberra, 2016. 
  David Lowe and Amit Sarwal (eds) Enriched Relations: Public Diplomacy in Australian-Indian Relations, Readworthy, New Delhi, 2013. 
  David Lowe (ed.), Australia and the End of Empires: The Impact of Decolonisation in Australia’s Near North, 1945–65, Deakin University Press, Geelong, 1996. 
  David Lowe (ed), Immigration and Integration: Australia and Britain, University of London, London, 1995.

References

External links 
 Deakin University Staff Page
 Contemporary Histories Research Group

1964 births
Living people
Monash University alumni
Alumni of the University of Cambridge
Academic staff of Deakin University
Australian biographers
21st-century Australian historians
20th-century Australian historians
Fellows of the Academy of the Social Sciences in Australia